AFCU may refer to:

 America First Credit Union
 Arizona Federal Credit Union
 Arkansas Federal Credit Union
 Armed Forces Christian Union
 Association of Franciscan Colleges and Universities